The 1998 NFL season was the 79th regular season of the National Football League (NFL).

The season culminated with Super Bowl XXXIII, with the Denver Broncos defeating the Atlanta Falcons 34–19 at Pro Player Stadium in Miami. The Broncos had won their first thirteen games, the best start since the undefeated 1972 Dolphins, and were tipped by some to have a realistic chance at winning all nineteen games. The Minnesota Vikings became the first team since the 1968 Baltimore Colts to win all but one of their regular season games and not win the Super Bowl. After no team had won 14 regular season games since the 1992 49ers, three teams went 14–2 or better for the only time in a 16-game season.

Football Outsiders argued that "1998 was the last hurrah for the great quarterbacks who came into the league in the 1980s. The top four QBs [statistically] were all over 35: Vinny Testaverde, Randall Cunningham, Steve Young, and John Elway. Troy Aikman, age 32, was fifth. Dan Marino was 11th in his last good year."

Draft
The 1998 NFL Draft was held from April 17 to 18, 1998 at New York City's Theater at Madison Square Garden. With the first pick, the Indianapolis Colts selected quarterback Peyton Manning from the University of Tennessee.

Referee changes
Dale Hamer and Gary Lane returned to head linesman and side judge, respectively. Tony Corrente and Ron Winter were promoted to referee.

Mike Pereira left the field after two seasons as a side judge to become an assistant supervisor of officials.  He succeeded Jerry Seeman as Vice President of Officiating in 2001. Pereira's replacement, Terry McAulay, assumed Pereira's old position and uniform number (77). McAulay was promoted to referee in 2001 and was crew chief for three Super Bowls (XXXIX, XLIII and XLVIII).

Major rule changes
 The officiating position titles of back judge and field judge were swapped to become more consistent with college and high school football. The field judge is now 20 yards deep, positioned on the same sideline as the line judge, while the back judge is 25 yards from the line of scrimmage near the center of the field.
 Tinted visors on players' facemasks are banned except for medical need.
 A defensive player can no longer flinch before the snap in an attempt to draw movement from an offensive lineman.
 A team will be penalized immediately for having 12 players in a huddle even if the 12th player goes straight to the sideline as the huddle breaks.
 During the season, the rules regarding the coin toss were changed to where the visiting team must make the call before the coin is tossed instead of while it was in the air. On Thanksgiving, the game between the Pittsburgh Steelers and Detroit Lions went to overtime. During the coin toss, Steelers running back Jerome Bettis was heard calling "tails" but referee Phil Luckett claimed he said "heads". The coin landed on tails, and the Lions won the toss and eventually the game on a Jason Hanson field goal. It was later revealed that Bettis had changed his mind during the call and was originally going to call "heads" but stopped. Thus, the rule change was adopted to prevent any further confusion.

Preseason

Hall of Fame Game
The 1998 Hall of Fame Class included Paul Krause, Tommy McDonald, Anthony Muñoz, an offensive lineman for the Cincinnati Bengals, Mike Singletary, a member of the Chicago Bears Super Bowl XX championship team, and Dwight Stephenson, a Pro Bowl offensive lineman with the Miami Dolphins.

Regular season

Scheduling formula

Highlights of the 1998 season included:
Thanksgiving: Two games were played on Thursday, November 26, featuring the Pittsburgh Steelers at the Detroit Lions and the Minnesota Vikings at the Dallas Cowboys, with the Lions and Vikings winning. The Steelers-Lions game is notable for going into overtime, where the Steelers' Jerome Bettis called the coin toss in the air, but referee Phil Luckett awarded the Lions the ball after he thought Bettis tried to call both heads and tails at the same time. The Lions went on to kick a field goal on the first possession, winning 19–16. In the other game, Vikings rookie wide receiver Randy Moss caught three touchdowns, all of over 50 yards in a 46–36 win.

Final standings

Tiebreakers
Miami finished ahead of Buffalo in the AFC East based on better net division points (6 to Bills’ 0).
Oakland finished ahead of Seattle in the AFC West based on head-to-head sweep (2–0).
Carolina finished ahead of St. Louis in the NFC West based on head-to-head sweep (2–0).

Playoffs

Statistical leaders

Team

Individual

Awards

Coaching changes

Offseason 
Oakland Raiders – Jon Gruden; replaced Joe Bugel, who was fired after the 1997 season.
Indianapolis Colts – Jim Mora; replaced Lindy Infante, who was fired after the 1997 season.
Dallas Cowboys – Chan Gailey; replaced Barry Switzer, who resigned after the 1997 season.
Buffalo Bills – Wade Phillips; replaced Marv Levy, who retired after the 1997 season.

In-season 
Atlanta Falcons - Rich Brooks; served as interim head coach for Weeks 16 and 17 of the 1998 season while Dan Reeves recovered from quadruple bypass surgery.

Stadium changes
 Baltimore Ravens: The Ravens moved from Memorial Stadium to Ravens Stadium at Camden Yards
 Buffalo Bills: Rich Stadium was renamed Ralph Wilson Stadium after Bills founder and owner Ralph Wilson
 Oakland Raiders: The Oakland Coliseum was renamed Network Associates Coliseum after the software company Network Associates acquired the naming rights
 Tampa Bay Buccaneers: The Buccaneers moved from Houlihan's Stadium to Raymond James Stadium, with Raymond James Financial acquiring the naming rights
 Tennessee Oilers: The Oilers moved from the Liberty Bowl Memorial Stadium in Memphis to Vanderbilt Stadium in Nashville

New uniforms
 The Baltimore Ravens began wearing their white pants instead of black with their white jerseys
 The Detroit Lions wore blue pants and silver-topped socks with their white jerseys for this season only
 The Jacksonville Jaguars removed the black side panels on uniforms
 The New York Jets unveiled a modernized version of the team's classic design and logo used from 1964 to 1977
 The San Diego Chargers returned to navy pants with their white jerseys
 The San Francisco 49ers switched from white to gold pants

Television
This was the first season that CBS held the rights to televise AFC games, taking over from NBC. Meanwhile, this was the first time that ESPN broadcast all of the Sunday night games throughout the season (this was also the first season in which ESPN's coverage used the Monday Night Football themes, before reverting to using an original theme in 2001). ABC and Fox renewed their rights for Monday Night Football and the NFC package, respectively. All of these networks signed eight-year television contracts through the 2005 season.

This was also the first season where the late games kicked off at 4:05pm ET & 4:15pm ET (replacing the original 4:00pm ET start time), to give networks more time to finish the early games before the start of the late games. The 4:15 start time would last until 2011.

MNF broadcasts were also pushed back from its 9:00pm ET start time to 8:00pm ET. The actual kickoffs were at 8:20pm, preceded by a new pregame show hosted by Chris Berman. Frank Gifford was then reassigned as a special contributor to the pregame show, while Boomer Esiason replaced Gifford in the booth.

Longtime CBS Sports announcer Jim Nantz was named as the host of the revived The NFL Today pregame show, with Marcus Allen, Brent Jones, and George Seifert as analysts. For its new lead broadcast team, CBS hired Greg Gumbel and Phil Simms from NBC. Randy Cross also came from NBC, and was paired with longtime CBS Sports announcer Verne Lundquist to form the network's new #2 crew.

Fox hired Cris Collinsworth from NBC to replace Ronnie Lott as one of the Fox NFL Sunday analysts.

ESPN hired Paul Maguire from NBC to join Mike Patrick and Joe Theismann in a three-man booth.

External links
Football Outsiders 1998 DVOA Ratings and Commentary
Pro Football Reference.com – 1998

References

 NFL Record and Fact Book
 NFL History 1991–2000 (Last accessed October 17, 2005)
 Total Football: The Official Encyclopedia of the National Football League
 Steelers Fever – History of NFL Rules (Last accessed October 17, 2005)

National Football League seasons
 
National Football League